Iturria is a Basque surname, meaning "Fountain". Notable people with the surname include:

Arthur Iturria (born 1994), French rugby union player
Asier Peña Iturria
Mikel Iturria (born 1992), Spanish cyclist
Victor Iturria (1914–1944), French paratrooper

Basque-language surnames